Mariental Rural is a constituency in the Hardap region of Namibia. Its administrative centre is the city of Mariental. It had a population of 15,308 in 2011, up from 13,946 in 2001.  the constituency had 4,065 registered voters.

Politics
The 2015 regional elections were won by Simon Christy Dukeleni of SWAPO with 1,207 votes. The runner-up and only challenger was Anna Elizabeth de Kock of the Rally for Democracy and Progress with 276 votes.

For the 2020 regional election "serious procedural errors" were discovered in Mariental Rural. No initial result were announced, and the electoral court ordered a re-run. The re-run was conducted on 26 February 2021. As in all other constituencies of Hardap, the candidate of the Landless People's Movement (LPM, a new party registered in 2018) won. Deensia Swartbooi obtained 1,099 votes. Simon Kooper of SWAPO came second with 854 votes.

References

External links

Constituencies of Hardap Region
States and territories established in 1992
1992 establishments in Namibia